Jordan Matthew Ford (born May 26, 1998) is an American professional basketball player for the Stockton Kings of the NBA G League. He played college basketball for the Saint Mary's Gaels.

Early life and high school career
Ford learned the game of chess at the age of four with his father, Cuzear, serving as his teacher. He began beating adults before winning two California state titles and was ranked seventh in the nation in his age bracket. However, he quit playing competitively at the age of eight to focus on basketball. Ford attended Folsom High School, playing under coach Mike Wall. He scored 34 points in a playoff game against Sacramento High School in March 2016. Ford was named the Sacramento Bee’s player of the year two times. He committed to play for Saint Mary's because he liked the structured offense, spurning offers from Gonzaga, California, Oregon and Oregon State.

College career
As a freshman, Ford considered redshirting, but ultimately came off the bench as a backup to Joe Rahon, who encouraged him to focus on his defense. In the summer of 2017, Ford was diagnosed with epiglottitis and ended up in the hospital, losing the 12 pounds he gained lifting weights. He scored 27 against BYU in the West Coast Conference tournament. Ford had 19 points against Southeastern Louisiana in the first round of the NIT and made a SportsCenter top 10 play when he took a pass from Emmett Naar and did a double-spin move to complete a layup off the glass. As a sophomore, Ford averaged 11.1 points, 2.7 rebounds, and 1.6 assists per game, shooting 50.8 percent from the field and 44.3 percent from behind the arc. Ford scored a career-high 35 points on 11-of-17 shooting in a 92–63 win over Utah Valley on November 13, 2018. As a junior, Ford was second in the WCC in scoring with 21.1 points per game to go with 2.5 assists, 2.8 rebounds, and 1.3 steals per game. He helped lead the Gaels to an upset on Gonzaga in the conference championship and NCAA Tournament appearance, where they fell to Villanova. He was named to the First Team All-WCC. 

Coming into his senior season, Ford began to be commonly known as "him". In his senior season opener, he scored 26 points and hit 4-of-8 three-pointers as Saint Mary's defeated Wisconsin 65–63 in overtime. At the conclusion of the regular season, Ford was named to the First Team All-WCC. On March 7, 2020, Ford scored a career-high 42 points in a 89–82 double overtime win over Pepperdine in the WCC Tournament quarterfinal. He scored 18 points in the WCC Tournament semifinal versus BYU and hit a jump shot with 1.4 seconds remaining to give the Gaels a 51–50 win. Ford averaged 21.9 points per game on a team that finished 26–8.

Professional career

Agua Caliente Clippers (2021)
After going undrafted in the 2020 NBA draft, Ford signed an Exhibit 10 contract with the Los Angeles Clippers. He was waived by the Clippers on December 14.

On February 4, 2021, Ford was included in the roster of the Agua Caliente Clippers.

Peristeri (2021)
On March 24, 2021, Ford signed with Greek club Peristeri for the rest of the 2020–21 season.

Return to Agua Caliente (2021–2022)
On September 24, 2021, Ford signed with the Los Angeles Clippers and was waived the same day. On October 27, Ford re-signed with the Agua Caliente Clippers.

Stockton Kings (2022–present)
On November 3, 2022, Ford was named to the opening night roster for the Stockton Kings.

Career statistics

College

|-
| style="text-align:left;"| 2016–17
| style="text-align:left;"| Saint Mary's
| 29 || 0 || 5.8 || .389 || .357 || .818 || .6 || .7 || .1 || .0 || 2.4
|-
| style="text-align:left;"| 2017–18
| style="text-align:left;"| Saint Mary's
| 36 || 36 || 27.4 || .508 || .443 || .754 || 2.7 || 1.6 || .9 || .1 || 11.1
|-
| style="text-align:left;"| 2018–19
| style="text-align:left;"| Saint Mary's
| 34 || 34 || 36.9 || .489 || .412 || .800 || 2.8 || 2.5 || 1.3 || .0 || 21.1
|-
| style="text-align:left;"| 2019–20
| style="text-align:left;"| Saint Mary's
| 34 || 34 || 38.0 || .492 || .411 || .836 || 3.0 || 2.3 || 1.4 || .0 || 21.9
|- class="sortbottom"
| style="text-align:center;" colspan="2"| Career
| 133 || 104 || 27.8 || .490 || .416 || .806 || 2.3 || 1.8 || .9 || .0 || 14.5

References

External links
Saint Mary's Gaels bio

1998 births
Living people
Agua Caliente Clippers players
American men's basketball players
Basketball players from California
People from Folsom, California
Peristeri B.C. players
Point guards
Saint Mary's Gaels men's basketball players
Shooting guards